Edward M. Rozzell House is a historic home located near Charlotte, Mecklenburg County, North Carolina.  It was built about 1880, and is a two-story, three bay, frame I-house with a kitchen ell. It has a side-gable roof and stucco covered brick end chimneys.  Also on the property are the contributing corn crib (c. 1900) and single-pen log barn (c. 1880).

It was listed on the National Register of Historic Places in 2005.

References

Houses on the National Register of Historic Places in North Carolina
Houses completed in 1880
Houses in Charlotte, North Carolina
National Register of Historic Places in Mecklenburg County, North Carolina